Thomas's bushbaby (Galagoides thomasi) is a species of primate in the family Galagidae. It is found in Angola, Burundi, Cameroon, Democratic Republic of the Congo, Equatorial Guinea, Gabon, Kenya, Nigeria, Rwanda, Tanzania, Uganda, and Zambia.

References

Thomas's bushbaby
Mammals of Angola
Mammals of Burundi
Mammals of Cameroon
Mammals of the Democratic Republic of the Congo
Mammals of Equatorial Guinea
Mammals of Gabon
Mammals of Kenya
Mammals of Rwanda
Mammals of Tanzania
Mammals of Uganda
Mammals of Zambia
Fauna of Central Africa
Mammals of West Africa
Thomas's bushbaby
Taxonomy articles created by Polbot